The Telugu Diaspora refers to Telugu people who live outside their homeland of Indian states of Andhra Pradesh and Telangana. They are predominantly found in North America, Europe, Australia, Caribbean, Gulf, Africa and other regions around the world. There are also few Telugus from other Indian states such as Karnataka, Tamil Nadu, Odisha and Maharashtra, who live outside India. Telugus of Andhra Pradesh origin, living outside India are often referred as Non-resident Andhras (NRA). After the bifurcation of the United Andhra Pradesh, these are popularly referred as Non-resident Telugus.

The Telugu Boom 
The Telugu Boom refers to the migration of a large number of Telugu speaking people from the Indian states of Andhra Pradesh and Telangana to the United States of America from late 80s largely consisting of the migration of students and Information Technology workers which continues to the present day. As of 2017, as per  Katherine Hadda, American Consulate general in Hyderabad, one in every four Indians going to USA is a Telugu person.

Background
With the onset of IT revolution in the late 1980s and 1990s coupled with high unemployment and corruption led more families to send their undergraduate children for higher studies to universities of developed countries on better job prospects. This was also supported with F1 visa program of USA and similar programs of other countries such as Canada and UK. The Y2K problem and Indian government's Software Technology Park initiative also helped many small companies to set up shops in Hyderabad that helped prospective employees to use H-1B Visa program.

Effects of the Migration on the society of Andhra Pradesh
Andhra Bank and State Bank of Hyderabad predominantly regional banks of the state of AP have reported rise in Non Resident Indian deposits over the last decade.

See also
 Telugu Americans
 Telugu people
 Andhra Pradesh
 Telangana
 Telugu Language
 Telugu language policy
 Malaysian Telugu
 Ahikuntaka

References

External links
Telangana NRI Association TeNA
North American Telugu Association NATA
List of Telugu Associations Worldwide
Andhra Pradesh Non-Resident Telugu Society

 
History of Andhra Pradesh
Economy of Andhra Pradesh
Indian diaspora by ethnic group
Demographic history of India